is a city located in Saitama Prefecture, Japan. , the city had an estimated population of 79,123 in 35,440 households and a population density of 410 persons per km².

Geography
Hannō is located on the southern border of Saitama Prefecture, bordered by the Tokyo to the south and the Chichibu region to the west. Both the Iruma River and the Koma River flow through the city. Hannō is mainly made up of urban and suburban areas, surrounded by mountains and rivers.

Surrounding municipalities
Saitama Prefecture
 Iruma
 Sayama
 Hidaka
 Chichibu
 Tokigawa
 Yokoze
 Ogose
 Moroyama
Tokyo Metropolis
 Oume
 Okutama

Climate
Hannō has a Humid subtropical climate (Köppen Cfa) characterized by warm summers and cool winters with light to no snowfall.  The average annual temperature in Hannō is 12.6 °C. The average annual rainfall is 1408 mm with September as the wettest month. The temperatures are highest on average in August, at around 24.9 °C, and lowest in January, at around 1.0 °C.

Demographics
Per Japanese census data, the population of Hannō peaked around the year 2000 and has declined slightly over the past 20 years.

History
Hannō was traditionally noted for its lumber industry, which developed during the Edo period to supply Edo with timber needed for rebuilding after its frequent fires. The town of Hannō was established within Koma District, Saitama with the establishment of the modern municipalities system on April 1, 1889. Koma District was abolished in 1896, becoming part of Iruma District.

Hannō annexed the neighboring villages of Seimei, Minami-Koma, Kaji and Moto-Kaji on April 1, 1943. It was elevated to city status on January 1, 1954. Hannō annexed the neighboring villages of Agano,  Gigshi-Agano, Haraichiba on September 30, 1956. On January 1, 2005, the village of Naguri was merged into Hannō.

Economy
The economy of Hannō is mixed, with a number of pharmaceutical firms and electronics firms maintaining factories in the area. A substantial fraction of the population commutes to Tokyo every day.

Government
Hannō has a mayor-council form of government with a directly elected mayor and a unicameral city council of 19 members. Hannō contributes one member to the Saitama Prefectural Assembly. In terms of national politics, the city is part of Saitama 9th district of the lower house of the Diet of Japan.

Education
Surugadai University – Hannō campus
 Hannō has 11 public elementary schools and seven public middle schools operated by the city government, and two public high schools operated by the Saitama Prefectural Board of Education. In addition, there are two private middle schools and three private high schools.

Transportation

Railway
 JR East – Hachiko Line

 Seibu Railway - Seibu Ikebukuro Line/Seibu Chichibu Line
  -  - <  -  > -  -  -  -

Highway

Sister cities
 Brea, California, United States, since January 5, 1981.

Local attractions
 JLPGA Mitsubishi Ladies Golf, late October
 Hannō Festival, first weekend of November
 Moomin Valley Park The theme park opened 2019.
 Akebono Children's Forest Park is another Moomin themed public park for children  that opened in  1997.

In popular culture
The anime series Encouragement of Climb is set in Hannō.

Noted people from Hannō 
 Yasue Sato, model, actress
 Makoto Matsubara, professional baseball player
 Mimura (actress)

References

External links

Official Website 

Cities in Saitama Prefecture
Hannō